Emma Gullstrand (born 13 September 2000) is a Swedish diver.

In 2019, she finished in 36th place in the preliminary round in the women's 1 metre springboard event at the 2019 World Aquatics Championships held in Gwangju, South Korea. In the women's 3 metre springboard event she finished in 19th place in the preliminary round. Gullstrand and Vinko Paradzik finished in 14th place in the mixed synchronized 3 metre springboard event.

In that same year, she also finished in 16th place in the preliminary round in the women's 1 metre springboard at the 2019 European Diving Championships held in Kyiv, Ukraine.

References 

Living people
2000 births
Place of birth missing (living people)
Swedish female divers
Divers at the 2020 Summer Olympics
Olympic divers of Sweden
21st-century Swedish women